Kirarin Revolution is a Japanese manga series that was adapted into an animated series from 2006 to 2009. Music for the series was managed by Up-Front Works and released under the Zetima label. Throughout its run, the show has released three studio albums, two live albums, one compilation album, nine video singles, eleven singles, five soundtrack albums, and twelve music videos.

Koharu Kusumi from the Japanese idol girl group Morning Musume made her solo singing and acting debut as the main character, Kirari Tsukishima; portraying the character both in the anime and in a real-world context made her one of the pioneers of the "idol voice actor" crossover beginning in the late 2000s. Along with providing Kirari Tsukishima's voice for the series, Kusumi released music as Kirari under the name , including providing the opening and ending themes to Kirarin Revolution.

From June to September 2007, Mai Hagiwara from Cute was cast as the anime-original character, Hikaru Mizuki, and became part of the in-show idol subunit Kira Pika with Kusumi; Hagiwara would also make live television appearances portraying the character and appeared as a special guest during Kirarin Revolution'''s final concert event on May 4, 2009.

The second season, Kirarin Revolution Stage 3, cast Sayaka Kitahara and You Kikkawa from Hello Pro Egg as the anime-original characters Noel Yukino and Kobeni Hanasaki, who form the in-show Japanese idol group MilkyWay with Kirari. Takuya Ide and Shikou Kanai were cast as the new voice actors for Hiroto Kazama and Seiji Hiwatari, the members of the in-show group Ships. Like Kusumi, MilkyWay and Ships released music and made appearances at concerts and other television shows, such as Haromoni and Oha Suta'', as their characters.

Albums

Studio albums

Compilation albums

Soundtrack albums

Singles

Videography

Video albums

Video singles

Music videos

Tours

Headlining
  (2008)
  (2009)

Concert participation
  (2006)
  (2007)
  (2007)
  (2008)

Notes

References 

Kirarin Revolution
Anime soundtracks
Film and television discographies